B35 may refer to:
 Bundesstraße 35, a German road
 B35 (New York City bus) in Brooklyn
 HLA-B35, an HLA-B serotype
 Beechcraft Model 35 Bonanza, 1950 version
 Northrop YB-35, an experimental aircraft
 B-35 (Michigan county highway)
 Avia B-35, a Czechoslovakian aircraft